The 1995 Ms. Olympia contest was an IFBB professional bodybuilding competition was held on September 9, 1995, in Atlanta, Georgia. It was the 16th Ms. Olympia competition held.

Results

Notable Events
This Ms. Olympia, along with the 1996 Ms. Olympia, had the highest total prize money at a Ms. Olympia, with $115,000, with $50,000 for the winner.

See also
 1995 Mr. Olympia

References

 1995 Ms Olympia Results
 1995 Ms. Olympia held in Atlanta 
 1995 Ms Olympia Gallery

External links
 Competitor History of the Ms. Olympia

Ms Olympia, 1995
1995 in bodybuilding
Ms. Olympia
Ms. Olympia
History of female bodybuilding